Hyperacrius is a genus of rodent in the family Cricetidae. It contains the following species:
 True's vole (Hyperacrius fertilis)
 Murree vole (Hyperacrius wynnei)

References

 
Rodent genera
Taxa named by Gerrit Smith Miller Jr.
Taxonomy articles created by Polbot